The 17th Infantry Division (XVII Merarchia Pezikou, XVII MP) was an infantry division of the Hellenic Army that fought in the Greco-Italian War.

Pre-war plans for defence against a joint Italian–Bulgarian attack (Plan "IB") envisaged the raising of the 17th Division during mobilization, and its employment against Bulgaria under the Kavala Army Section, in eastern Macedonia.

When Italy invaded Greece in October 1940, the division was mobilized, but as Bulgaria remained neutral, it was transferred to the Albanian front and fought against the Italian army as part of III Army Corps under the Western Macedonia Army Section. Following the German invasion of Greece and the capitulation of the Greek army in Albania, the division was disbanded.

References

Sources 
 

1940 establishments in Greece
1941 disestablishments in Greece
Infantry divisions of Greece
Military units and formations of Greece in World War II